{{Infobox Christian leader
| type        = Cardinal
| honorific-prefix = His Eminence
| name        = Baltazar Enrique Porras Cardozo
| title       = Cardinal, Metropolitan Archbishop of Caracas
| image       = Baltazar-Enrique-Porras.jpg
| alt         = 
| caption     = 
| church      = Roman Catholic Church
| archdiocese = Caracas
| diocese     = 
| see         = Caracas
| appointed   = 17 January 2023
| enthroned   = 
| term        = 
| predecessor = Jorge Liberato Urosa Savino
| successor   = 
| other_post = 

| ordination     = 30 July 1967
| ordained_by   = Miguel Antonio Salas Salas
| consecration   = 17 September 1983
| consecrated_by = José Lebrún Moratinos
| cardinal       = 19 November 2016
| created_cardinal_by = Pope Francis
| rank           = Cardinal-Priest

| birth_date    = 
| birth_place   = Caracas, Venezuela
| death_date    = 
| death_place   = 
| previous_post = 
| coat_of_arms = Coat of arms of Baltazar Enrique Porras Cardozo.svg
| motto = "''In Nomine Tuo"(In Your name)
}}Baltazar Enrique Porras Cardozo''' (born 10 October 1944) is a Venezuelan prelate of the Catholic Church, who was named Metropolitan Archbishop of Caracas in 2023 after serving as apostolic administrator there for four and a half years. He was auxiliary bishop of Mérida from 1983 to 1991 and then metropolitan archbishop of Mérida from 1991 to 2023. Pope Francis made him a cardinal in 2016.

Life

Baltazar Enrique Porras Cardozo was born on 10 October 1944 in Caracas. He attended Colegio Fray Luis de León and St. Teresa parish school. He studied philosophy at the Saint Rose of Lima Interdiocesan Seminary in Caracas. He earned a licentiate in theology and a doctorate in pastoral theology at the Pontifical University of Salamanca in Spain.

He was ordained to the priesthood on 30 July 1967 by Miguel Antonio Salas Salas. He was appointed Auxiliary Bishop of Mérida on 23 July 1983 and received his episcopal consecration on 17 September 1983 from Cardinal José Lebrún Moratinos. He was appointed Metropolitan Archbishop of Mérida on 31 October 1991 and was installed there on 5 December.

He served as apostolic administrator of the Diocese of San Cristóbal from 2 March 1998 to 8 June 1999. 

He was president of the Venezuelan Episcopal Conference from 1999 to 2006. Within the Episcopal Conference of Latin America (CELAM), he was president of the Department of the Laity from 1995 to 1999 and of the Department of Communication from 2003 to 2007. He served as the organization's first vice president from 2007 to 2011.

Pope Francis announced on 9 October 2016 that he would make him a cardinal at a consistory on 19 November 2016. At that consistory Porras was named Cardinal-Priest of Santi Giovanni Evangelista e Petronio.

Francis made him a member of the Dicastery for the Laity, Family and Life on 23 December 2017. In September 2019, Pope Francis named him one of the three cardinals to serve as presidents of the Synod for the Amazon.

Pope Francis named him Apostolic Administrator of the Metropolitan Archdiocese of Caracas on 9 July 2018. He was named a member of the Pontifical Council for Culture on 11 November 2019.

Pope Francis appointed him Metropolitan Archbishop of Caracas on 17 January 2023.

See also
 Cardinals created by Pope Francis
 Catholic Church in Venezuela

References

External links
 
Catholic Hierarchy

1944 births
20th-century Roman Catholic archbishops in Venezuela
21st-century Roman Catholic archbishops in Venezuela
Living people
People from Caracas
Cardinals created by Pope Francis
Venezuelan cardinals
Roman Catholic archbishops of Mérida in Venezuela
Roman Catholic bishops of Mérida in Venezuela
Venezuelan Roman Catholic archbishops